Kinesis was a magazine published from 1974 to 2001, by Vancouver Status of Women, in Vancouver, British Columbia, Canada. Subtitled "news about women that's not in the dailies", it was published 10 times each year and carried news with a social change and feminist perspective. It acted as a forum for queer, immigrant, anti-classist, anti-ablecentrist voices.

It was edited by 
 Emma Kivisild (1984–1986)
 Esther Shannon (1986–1988)
 Nancy Pollak (1988–1992)
 Fatima Jaffer (1992–1994)

Funding issues (Vancouver Status of Women was funded in part by government grants) and changes in editorial direction led to the shuttering of the magazine in 2001.

Many issues of Kinesis are accessible online in the University of British Columbia Library's Digital Collections.

References

1974 establishments in British Columbia
2001 disestablishments in British Columbia
Anti-classism
Defunct magazines published in Canada
Disability rights
Feminism in British Columbia
Feminist magazines
Magazines established in 1974
Magazines disestablished in 2001
Magazines published in Vancouver
Ten times annually magazines
Women's magazines published in Canada